Easytown is an unincorporated community in Clinton Township, Vermillion County, in the U.S. state of Indiana.

History
According to tradition, Easytown was so named on account of the "easygoing" spirit of its residents.

References

Unincorporated communities in Vermillion County, Indiana
Unincorporated communities in Indiana